WATR (1320 AM) is a radio station licensed to serve Waterbury, Connecticut and the Naugatuck Valley.  The station is owned by WATR, Inc.  It airs a full-service format featuring news/talk, as well as classic hits. It was until May 2022 the oldest privately owned station in the state of Connecticut, never having been sold outside the family of its founder, Harold Thomas (1902–1968).

The station is host to "Tom Chute & You," the weekday morning drive program hosted by general manager and program director Thomas J. Chute with news director Christopher M. Fortier, veteran regional journalist, anchoring news reports through the noon hour. It is the fourth-longest continuously running morning drive radio program in Connecticut, having debuted on January 2, 1986.

Barbara Hart Davitt, who marked 59 years at the station on November 22, 2022, hosts "Coffee Break" at 9:30 a.m. four days a week. Debuting in the mid-1960s, it is one of the longest-running radio shows in the U.S. Davitt in 2018 was the first Waterbury-area radio personality inducted into the Connecticut Broadcasters Association Hall of Fame.

"Talk of the Town," WATR's flagship talk show since 1972, airs from 10:00 a.m. to 12:00 p.m. with a focus on local and state issues. Previous hosts include Steven Noxon, Larry Rifkin, Ed Flynn, James Senich and Jay Clark. Fortier serves as the program's executive producer.

The station, as of January 14, 2023, is an ABC News Radio affiliate. 

Weekend programming highlights include the Sunday morning "Carosello Italiano," hosted by Joe Costa and featuring music and news from the Italian community, and the Sunday night "Music Museum" hosted by long-time Connecticut broadcaster Jay Crawford.

The station was also host to the popular "Polish Eagle Show," originated in 1934 on WATR by bandleader Victor Zembruski (1912–1976). His widow, Sophie Zembruski (1918–2010), hosted the show from 1976 to 2008, at which time the couple's daughter, Loretta Hoxie, took over hosting duties. "The Zembruski Family Polka Hour," hosted by Nathaniel Zembruski, succeeded Hoxie shortly after she retired in 2013. Zembruski, at age 17, decided to end the show as his junior year of high school concluded. Its finale aired on May 31, 2020.

The station also maintains a decades-long tradition of broadcasting play-by-play of local high school football and basketball. In 2018, WATR joined the University of Connecticut sports radio network. The first UConn Huskies football game was broadcast August 28, 2018.

WATR once had sister FM and television stations: WATR-FM, established in 1961, now WWYZ, and WATR-TV, established in 1953, later WTXX and now WCCT-TV.

It was announced on February 24, 2020, that the station was up for sale. A partnership between WWCO owner David Webster and WARE owner Kurt Jackson purchased the station in May 2022.

The station has been assigned the WATR call letters by the Federal Communications Commission since it was initially licensed in 1934.

Translator

References

External links

ATR
News and talk radio stations in the United States
Classic hits radio stations in the United States
Radio stations established in 1934
1934 establishments in Connecticut
Full service radio stations in the United States